Agustín Rayo (born 1973) is a Mexican philosopher of logic, metaphysics, and language. He is the dean of the MIT School of Humanities, Arts, and Social Sciences and a professor of philosophy. Rayo's number is named after him.

Life 
Rayo was raised in Mexico City. He completed a bachelor's degree at the National Autonomous University of Mexico in 1996. Rayo earned a Ph.D. at Massachusetts Institute of Technology in 2001. He was a postdoctoral researcher at the University of St Andrews.

Rayo was an assistant professor of philosophy at the University of California, San Diego. In 2005, he joined the MIT School of Humanities, Arts, and Social Sciences. Rayo was the associate dean from 2016 to 2019. He succeeded Melissa Nobles in 2021 as interim dean.

Rayo was elected to the Norwegian Academy of Science and Letters in 2018. His book, On the Brink of Paradox (2019) won the 2020 PROSE Award for best textbook in the humanities.

References 

Living people
People from Mexico City
National Autonomous University of Mexico alumni
Massachusetts Institute of Technology alumni
Massachusetts Institute of Technology faculty
21st-century Mexican philosophers
Philosophers of logic
Philosophers of language
Metaphysicians
Mexican emigrants to the United States
University of California, San Diego faculty
Members of the Norwegian Academy of Science and Letters
1973 births